Jonathan Zamora (born October 31, 1996) is a professional Canadian football offensive lineman for the Calgary Stampeders of the Canadian Football League (CFL).

University career
Zamora played U Sports football for the St. Francis Xavier X-Men from 2016 to 2019 where he played in 31 games over four seasons. In 2018, he was named a U Sports Second Team All-Canadian and was also a Loney Bowl champion.

Professional career

Calgary Stampeders
Zamora was drafted in the third round, 26th overall, in the 2020 CFL Draft by the Calgary Stampeders, but did not play in 2020 due to the cancellation of the 2020 CFL season. He then signed with the team on January 21, 2021. Zamora spent the 2021 season with the Stampeders on the practice roster and did not dress in a regular season game for the team.

Toronto Argonauts
On November 3, 2021, it was announced that the Toronto Argonauts had claimed Zamora from the Stampeders' practice roster. As per CFL rules, he was required to play in the Argonauts' game in the following week, where he made his professional debut on November 12, 2021, against the Hamilton Tiger-Cats. He then made his first career start on November 16, 2021, against the Edmonton Elks, at centre. Zamora made his playoff debut in the East Final two weeks later, but the Argonauts lost to the Tiger-Cats.

Zamora played in the first two games of the 2022 season, but was released on July 2, 2022.

Calgary Stampeders (II)
On July 11, 2022, it was announced that Zamora had re-signed with the Calgary Stampeders.

Personal life
Zamora is fluent in Spanish.

References

External links
Calgary Stampeders bio 

1996 births
Living people
Calgary Stampeders players
Canadian football offensive linemen
Canadian football people from Toronto
Players of Canadian football from Ontario
St. Francis Xavier X-Men football players
Toronto Argonauts players